Zoodes maculatus is a species of Longhorn beetle native to Sri Lanka and India.

Description
The species has a dull reddish or testaceous tegument, with slightly lighter elytra. Fine pubescence found all over the body. There is a pattern of maculae on prothorax and elytra. Head square-shaped and eyes are large. Antennae are pilose and longer than body. Prothorax is transverse with sinuate narrowly black, posterior margin. Scutellum is black colored and small. Outer elytral border is narrowly black. Legs are long, and slender.

References 

Cerambycinae
Insects of Sri Lanka
Insects of India
Insects described in 1855